Grace Wyngaard is an American biologist at James Madison University and an Elected Fellow of the American Association for the Advancement of Science.

References

Year of birth missing (living people)
Living people
Fellows of the American Association for the Advancement of Science
James Madison University faculty
University of Rhode Island alumni
University of South Florida alumni
University System of Maryland alumni